Aznab-e Olya may refer to:
 Aznab-e Olya, East Azerbaijan
 Aznab-e Olya, Kermanshah